This is a list of Minnesota synagogues, including the city in which each is located and the branch of Judaism with which each is affiliated.

References

External links

Synagogue
 
Minnesota
Synagogues